Střevač is a municipality and village in Jičín District in the Hradec Králové Region of the Czech Republic. It has about 300 inhabitants.

Administrative parts
Villages of Batín, Nadslav and Štidla are administrative parts of Střevač.

References

Villages in Jičín District